"Congratulations" is a song co-written and performed by American contemporary R&B singer Vesta Williams (then known mononymously as Vesta), issued as the third and final official single from her third studio album Vesta 4 U. It was her only single to appear on the Billboard Hot 100, peaking at #55 on the chart in 1989.

Chart positions

References

External links
 
 

1988 songs
1989 singles
A&M Records singles
Songs written by Vesta Williams
Vesta Williams songs
1980s ballads
Contemporary R&B ballads